Department of Statistics might refer to numerous governmental agencies charged with compiling and publishing statistical information, including:

Department of Statistics of the Ministry of Trade and Industry (Singapore)
Statistics department (Anguilla)
Department of Statistics (Bermuda)
Department of Statistics (Lithuania)
Census and Statistics Department (Hong Kong)
National Administrative Department of Statistics (Colombia)
Statistics New Zealand

See also
List of national and international statistical services
:Category:National statistical services